is a 2017 French-Japanese adult animated science fiction film based on the comic series and the short film of the same name. The film was a French-Japanese co-production between Ankama Animations and Studio 4°C and is directed by Shōjirō Nishimi and Guillaume "Run" Renard. The comic would be published in English as M.F.K.Z. by the Behemoth Comics imprint, Happy Tank beginning in June 2021. Mutafukaz was released in France on May 23, 2018 and in Japan on October 12, 2018. At the end of December 2022, it was added to Hulu's streaming platform.

Plot
A young woman carrying an infant is chased by black-suited men. Some of the men are killed by a dog who sprouts black tentacles. The woman manages to hide the baby in a dumpster before she is killed by one of the men.

Years later, the infant, now grown to a 22-year-old young man and named Angelino, lives in a run-down apartment in Dark Meat City (DMC) with his friend Vinz and countless "pet" cockroaches. While making a delivery, Angelino is distracted by Luna, a beautiful young woman, and is hit by a truck. This causes Angelino to start having headaches and hallucinate. The MIB, strange men in black suits led by a white-suited man named Bruce, begin pursuing Angelino. Angelino calls his friend Willy, and they hide in the rundown crime neighborhood of Palm Hills. Angelino and Vinz are later found again by the MIB,  who engage the local gangs in a gunfight, killing people from both sides.  Elsewhere, a Luchador tells his comrades about a vision he had about a potential evil they must combat.

In the restaurant they frequent, Angelino and Vinz run into Luna, who is actually working with the MIB and gets the two captured. Luna's father, Mr. K, is the leader of an alien race called Macho who have infiltrated the Earth including politicians and the police in order to eventually colonize the planet. Angelino is the child of a Macho father and a human woman which results in unpredictable and potentially powerful combinations that Mr. K wants to exploit. Mr. K tries to brainwash Angelino and convince him to kill his friend Vinz, while Luna switches sides after witnessing Angelino's past. They are rescued by the group of Luchadors who have followed Angelino's pet cockroaches that instinctively tracked Angelino down, and are joined by a scientist named Fagor who was the only one out of several kidnapped scientists working with the Macho.

Crocodile (a MIB from earlier) arrives at Willy's house and holds him hostage. Angelino and Vinz decide to return and Angelino rescues Willy. The Luchadores and Fagor launch the rocket, triggering it to snow across the country, freezing and killing all of the hidden Macho, while causing a news helicopter to crash, destroying Willy's house and killing Crocodile. Angelino, being half Macho, begins freezing, but is saved by Luna's kiss and she apologizes to him. Bruce arrives for a climactic fight against Angelino, who saves Luna from being killed and refuses to use his Macho powers. Before Bruce takes the opportunity to kill Angelino, the local gangs gun him down as revenge for previously invading their hood and for shooting their leader in the eye.

Two months later, everything goes back to "normal" with people forgetting about the incident. Vinz finally gets a job at the restaurant they frequent. Angelino writes letters to Luna who disappeared after his fight with Bruce despite not knowing where in DMC she is. Willy, who also disappeared after the fight, creates his first music single. Mr. K is shown to have survived and has set up a base on the moon, where he begins sending UFOs to potentially invade earth.

Voice cast

French cast
 Orelsan as Angelino
 Gringe as Vinz
 Redouanne Harjane as Willy
 Féodor Atkine as Mister K
 Kelly Marot as Luna
 Julien Kramer as Bruce Macchabée & El Diablo
 Emmanuel Karsen as Randy Crocodile  
 Gilbert Lévy as Professor Fagor
 Alain Dorval as El Tigre
 Frantz Confiac as Popeye

English cast
 Kenn Michael as Angelino
 Vince Staples as Vinz
 Dascha Polanco as Luna
 Dino Andrade as Willy
 Danny Trejo as Bruce
 Giancarlo Esposito as Mr. K
 Michael Chiklis as Agent Randy Crocodile
 RZA as Shakespeare (a.k.a. Popeye)
 Jorge Gutierrez as El Tigre
 Bill Lobley as Professor Fagor
 Antonio Alvarez as El Diablo

Release 
Mutafukaz had its world premiere on June 13, 2017 at the Annecy International Animation Film Festival. The film was released in France on May 23, 2018. Parco released the film in Japan on October 12, 2018. GKIDS released the English dub of the film in a limited theatrical run in the U.S. and Canada on October 11 and October 16, 2018. MFKZ was added to Hulu's streaming platform at the end of December 2022.

Reception
On Rotten Tomatoes, the film has a score of 39% based on 19 reviews with an average rating of 4.90/10.

References

Notes

External links 

 
 
 
 

2010s French animated films
2010s Japanese films
Japanese animated films
2017 anime films
2017 films
Animated films based on comics
Films based on French comics
Films set in California
Features based on short films
Studio 4°C
Fictional serial killers
2010s crime films
Crime in anime and manga
Hood films
Mass media franchises introduced in 2001
2001 introductions
2006 comics debuts
French comics
French adult animated films